Housem Ferchichi (born 26 March 1996) is an Italian footballer of Tunisian descent who plays as a midfielder for S.S.D. Marsala Calcio in Serie D.

References

External links

1996 births
People from Montebelluna
Italian people of Tunisian descent
Italian sportspeople of African descent
Living people
Association football midfielders
Italian footballers
U.S. Livorno 1915 players
L.R. Vicenza players
S.S.D. Marsala Calcio players
Serie C players
Serie D players
Sportspeople from the Province of Treviso
Footballers from Veneto